Rudi Wulf (born 2 February 1984) is a New Zealand rugby union player who plays for Lyon in the French Top 14. He previously played for Toulon and Castres Olympique.

Wulf has also played for North Harbour in the Air New Zealand Cup and the Auckland-based Blues in the Super 14 competition. He played for Marist in the North Harbour premier competition.

Wulf is regarded as a three quarter, in that he can play wing, fullback and outside centre.

He attended high school at Rosmini College where he played 1st XV rugby alongside fellow former All Black, Anthony Boric.

Wulf's career almost ended before it began when, in June 2005, he suffered a serious injury by diving into the shallow end of a swimming pool and fracturing vertebrae in his neck. He made a full recovery.

He is related to French rugby league international Vincent Wulf.

References

External links
Blues profile
itsrugby.co.uk profile

1984 births
New Zealand rugby union players
Blues (Super Rugby) players
Rugby union wings
North Harbour rugby union players
Living people
New Zealand international rugby union players
People educated at Rosmini College
RC Toulonnais players
New Zealand expatriate rugby union players
New Zealand expatriate sportspeople in France
Expatriate rugby union players in France
Rugby union players from Auckland